Orchard with Cypresses (Verger avec cyprès in French) is an 1888 painting by Dutch artist Vincent van Gogh. The work was in the collection of artworks of Microsoft co-founder Paul Allen, and was sold at auction on 10 November 2022 by Christie's New York branch for $117.2 million dollars, the highest amount paid for a work by van Gogh.

See also
 List of most expensive paintings

References

1888 paintings
Paintings by Vincent van Gogh